Odoh may refer to:

 Oblivious DNS over HTTPS (ODoH), a computer network protocol
 Ohio Department of Transportation, formerly known as the Ohio Department of Highways
 Abraham Odoh, English footballer
 Diego Odoh Okenyodo, Nigerian writer, activist, and pharmacist
 Uche Odoh, Nigerian photographer

Igbo-language surnames